Krv i led (Serbian Cyrillic: Крв и лед; trans. Blood and Ice) is the 1991 debut album from former Yugoslav and Serbian hard rock/heavy metal band Osvajači.

Track 8, "Jedna me devojka neće", is a cover of Uriah Heep's "Stealin'", translated to the Serbian language.

Track listing
All lyrics by Zvonko Pantović. All music by Dragan Urošević, except where noted.
"Pronađi me" – 4:28
"Nikad više s tobom" – 3:53
"Krv i led" – 4:02
"Sad mi treba" – 3:57
"Bledi ruž" - 3:00
"Gde da pobegnem" – 4:09
"Jako srce udara" – 4:32
"Jedna me devojka neće" (Z. Pantović, K. Hensley) – 3:42
"Možda nebo zna" – 5:18

Personnel
Zvonko Pantović - vocals
Dragan Urošević - guitars
Saša Popović - bass guitar
Miša Raca - drums
Laza Ristovski - keyboards

References
 EX YU ROCK enciklopedija 1960-2006,  Janjatović Petar;  

Osvajači albums
1991 debut albums
PGP-RTB albums